Peter Gelderblom (born Gouda, Netherlands ) is a Dutch DJ and record producer.

Biography
Peter Gelderblom is inspired by among other Slipknot, Rammstein and Gerard Joling. He has worked for several years as a DJ in various clubs in Rotterdam. Peter Gelderblom broke through with the single "Waiting 4" in the Netherlands in 2007. This came in the Dutch Top 40 at number 37.

In 1997 Peter Gelderblom was heard on Channel X 103.2 and he opened with his wife and a companion De Boot Barocca in Rotterdam. Peter had an own weekly radio show called The Wheels of Revolution on Radio Decibel on Saturday the end of 2010. With his wife , he also had a club in Rotterdam for years called Revolution. This club was ordered by the mayor of Rotterdam closed following a shooting incident in front of the shop in the center of Rotterdam.

Discography

Charting singles

Singles
2007 Peter Gelderblom - Waiting 4 
2008 DJ Chus & Peter Gelderblom - Feelin' 4 You
2008 Peter Gelderblom & Muzikjunki - Trapped 
2008 Peter Gelderblom - Where The Streets Have no name
2009 Peter Gelderblom - Lost
2010 Peter Gelderblom & Aad Mouthaan - Just A Feeling
2011 Peter Gelderblom - Satisfaction
2011 Peter Gelderblom & Dominica - I Gotta Let You Go
2015 Peter Gelderblom & Randy Collé feat Kris Kiss - The Ride

Remixes

References

Notes
 A  Did not enter the Ultratop 50, but peaked on the Flemish Ultratip chart.

Sources

External links
 Beatport

1965 births
Living people
Dutch dance musicians
Dutch house musicians
Dutch DJs
Dutch record producers
People from Gouda, South Holland